Daniel Díaz Torres (31 December 1948 – 16 September 2013) was a Cuban film director and screenwriter. He directed 16 films since 1975. His 1985 film Wild Dogs was entered into the 14th Moscow International Film Festival.

Selected filmography
 Wild Dogs (1985)
 Alice in Wondertown (1991)

References

External links

1948 births
2013 deaths
Cuban film directors
Cuban screenwriters
Cuban male writers
Male screenwriters
People from Havana